This list contains all European emperors, kings and regent princes and their consorts as well as well-known crown princes since the Middle Ages, whereas the lists are starting with either the beginning of the monarchy or with a change of the dynasty (e.g. England with the Norman king William the Conqueror, Spain with the unification of Castile and Aragon, Sweden with the Vasa dynasty, etc.). In addition, it contains the still-existing principalities of Monaco and Liechtenstein and the Grand-Duchy of Luxembourg.

Albania
Kingdom from 1928 until 1943 (1939–1943 in personal union with Italy)

Austria
Empire under the Habsburg monarchy from 1804 until 1918. All emperors, with the exception of Charles I, were buried in the Imperial Crypt (Kaisergruft), at the Capuchin Church, in Vienna. Their hearts are buried in the Herzgruft (Crypt of the Hearts) at the St. Augustine Church at the Imperial Palace, in Vienna. Their viscera are buried in the Ducal Crypt at the Stephansdom, in Vienna.

Bavaria
Kingdom from 1806 until 1918. The Bavarian kings of the house of Wittelsbach were buried in four churches in Munich, whereas the hearts used to be buried in Altötting.

Belgium
Kingdom since 1830. All Belgian kings were buried in the royal burial place in Laeken.

Bohemia
Kingdom since 1198, as from 1526 in personal union with Austria.

Bulgaria
Empire from the 7th century to 1018, 1185 to 15th century. Kingdom from 1908 until 1945.

Croatia
Kingdom from 1941 until 1943

Denmark
One of the oldest kingdoms in Europe, established in the 11th century. The lists starts with the dynasty of Folkung in 1376. For the last 500 years, almost all monarchs have been interred in Roskilde Cathedral. Many earlier monarchs were interred in the Church of St. Bendt in Ringsted, and a few in Sorø monastery church.

England

See also Great Britain

Kingdom since the 9th century. The lists starts with the dynasty of the Normans in 1066. For a long period, Westminster Abbey was the most important burial place of the English monarchs, whereas early kings were also interred in other parts of England and in their French territories of Anjou and the Normandy.

Etruria

Kingdom from 1801 until 1807 (covered the territory of the former grand-duchy of Tuscany)

France
Kingdom since 814. Burial site of the French Royal Family is the Saint-Denis Basilica, where most of the kings were buried. The burial place of the Bonaparte family is the Chapelle Impériale in Ajaccio, but the two emperors were interred elsewhere.

Georgia

Great Britain

The kingdoms of England and Scotland were unified with the accession of James I of England and VI of Scotland in 1603. The Act of Union uniting the parliaments took place in 1707, with the United Kingdom formally coming into existence in 1801. Since the 18th century, sovereigns and their spouses have been buried at St George's Chapel, Windsor Castle, with the exception of Queen Victoria and Edward VIII, who are interred with other members of the Royal family at Frogmore. Victoria and Albert are interred in the Royal Mausoleum there.

Greece
Kingdom from 1832 until 1973. The kings from the house of Glücksburg are all buried at Tatoi nearby Athens, the first king from the house of Wittelsbach is interred in Munich, Bavaria.

Hanover
Kingdom from 1814 until 1866 (from 1814 until 1837 in personal union with Great Britain).

Holy Roman Empire
Federation under the Roman-German emperor resp. the German king from 800 until 1806. Under the Habsburg reign, the Kapuzinergruft in Vienna ("Imperial Crypt") became the family burial site of the Roman-German emperors; in earlier times the emperors used to be buried in different cities of the Empire (Aix-la-Chapelle, Speyer, Prague, Graz etc.).

Hungary
Kingdom from 1000 until 1540, afterwards in personal union with Austria. Most of the kings were buried in Székesfehérvár basilica or in Oradea Cathedral in today's Romania. Both burial sites were destroyed by the Turks.

Italy
Kingdom from 1713 until 1946 (until 1720 Kingdom of Sardinia and until 1861 Piemont-Sardinia). Family burial sites are the Basilica di Superga in Turin and since the unification of Italy the Pantheon in Rome.

Liechtenstein
Principality since 1608. Until the dissolution of the Austrian-Hungarian monarchy, the princes were buried in Vranov nearby Brno close to their residences in Lednice and Valtice. Afterwards, a new burial site was erected in the territory of the principality.

Lithuania
Kingdom from 1251, later Grand Princehood. The Lithuanian dynasty from the family of Gediminas (the Gediminid dynasty) ruled the Grand Duchy of Lithuania and later the Kingdom of Poland.

Luxembourg
Independent grand-duchy since 1890. All grand-dukes have been interred in Luxembourg Cathedral.

Monaco
Principality since 1633. All princes were buried in Monaco cathedral. Some graves no longer exist, as the former cathedral had been destroyed.

Montenegro
Kingdom from 1910 until 1918.

Naples
In the Middle Ages two separate kingdoms, then under foreign rule. From 1735 until 1860 independent kingdom under the Bourbon dynasty. Most of the kings are buried at Santa Chiara in Naples.

Netherlands
Kingdom since 1815 (from 1806 until 1810 kingdom under Napoleon's brother). All kings from the Nassau dynasty are buried in the New Church in Delft.

Norway
Established as a unified kingdom c. 872. In the Middle Ages the king would be buried in the city of his residence which varied between Bergen, Trondheim and Oslo. From 1380 until 1905 the kingdom was in personal union with Denmark or Sweden with the king mostly residing and being buried outside Norway. The Norwegian kings of the modern era and their spouses are as an established custom buried at Akershus Fortress in Oslo.

Ottoman Empire 
Established in 1299 as a beylik (principality) and gradually became an empire as its territory expanded, lasting until 1922. Most of the sultans and consorts were buried in Bursa and Istanbul, both of which were once the imperial capital.
{| width = "95%" border = 1 border="1" cellpadding="4" cellspacing="0" style="margin: 0.5em 1em 0.5em 0; background: #f9f9f9; border: 1px #aaa solid; border-collapse: collapse;"
! width="30%" bgcolor="#ffdead" |Name
! width="10%" bgcolor="#ffdead" |Born-died
! width="90%" bgcolor="#ffdead" |Burial site
|-
|Sultan Osman I
|?-1323/1324
|Tomb of Osman Gazi in Bursa
|-
|Rabia Bala Hatun
|1250/1260-1324
|Tomb of Sheikh Edebali in Bilecik
|-
|Sultan Orhan
|1281-1362
|Tomb of Orhan Gazi in Bursa
|-
|Nilüfer Hatun
|c. 1283-c. 1383
|Tomb of Orhan Gazi in Bursa
|-
|Asporça Hatun
|c. 1300-1362
|Tomb of Orhan Gazi in Bursa
|-
|Eftandise Hatun
|Unknown
|Bursa
|-
|Sultan Murad I
|1326-1389
|Organs buried at the Tomb of Sultan Murad in Kosovo Field, other remains buried at the Tomb of Sultan Murad in Bursa
|-
|Gülçiçek Hatun
|c. 1335-?
|Bursa
|-
|Kera Tamara
|c. 1340-c. 1389
|Bursa
|-
|Sultan Bayezid I
|c. 1360-1403
|Bursa
|-
|Devlet Hatun
|c. 1361-1414
|Tomb of Devlet Hatun in Bursa
|-
|Sultan Mehmed I
|1389-1421
|Green Tomb in Bursa
|-
|Sultan Murad II
|1404-1451
|Muradiye Complex in Bursa
|-
|Sultan Hatun
|Unknown
|Ishak Pasha Mausoleum in İnegöl
|-
|Hüma Hatun
|c. 1410-1449
|Muradiye Complex in Bursa
|-
|Sultan Mehmed II
|1432-1481
|Fatih Mosque in Istanbul
|-
|Gülbahar Hatun
|?-c. 1492
|Fatih Mosque in Istanbul
|-
|Gülşah Hatun
|?-c. 1487
|Muradiye Complex in Bursa
|-
|Sittişah Hatun
|?-1486
|Sittişah Hatun Mosque in Edirne
|-
|Çiçek Hatun
|c. 1442-1498
|Cairo
|-
|Sultan Bayezid II
|1447-1512
|Bayezid II Mosque in Istanbul
|-
|Şirin Hatun
|Unknown
|Muradiye Complex in Bursa
|-
|Hüsnüşah Hatun
|?-c. 1513
|Muradiye Complex in Bursa
|-
|Nigar Hatun
|?-1503
|Yivliminare Mosque in Antalya
|-
|Gülruh Hatun
|Unknown
|Muradiye Complex in Bursa
|-
|Gülbahar Valide Hatun
|c. 1453-c. 1505
|Gülbahar Hatun Mosque in Trabzon
|-
|Ferahşad Hatun
|Unknown
|Muradiye Complex in Bursa
|-
|Sultan Selim I
|1470-1520
|Yavuz Selim Mosque in Istanbul
|-
|Hafsa Sultan
|c. 1478-1534
|Yavuz Selim Mosque in Istanbul
|-
|Sultan Suleiman I
|c. 1476-c. 1539
|Süleymaniye Mosque in Istanbul
|-
|Mahidevran
|c. 1500-1581
|Muradiye Complex in Bursa
|-
|Hurrem Sultan
|c. 1502/1504-1558
|Süleymaniye Mosque in Istanbul
|-
|Sultan Selim II
|1524-1574
|Hagia Sophia in Istanbul
|-
|Nurbanu Sultan
|c. 1525-1583
|Hagia Sophia in Istanbul
|-
|Sultan Murad III
|1546-1595
|Hagia Sophia in Istanbul
|-
|Safiye Sultan
|c. 1550-c. 1619
|Hagia Sophia in Istanbul
|-
|Sultan Mehmed III
|1566-1603
|Hagia Sophia in Istanbul
|-
|Handan Sultan
|?-1605
|Hagia Sophia in Istanbul
|-
|Halime Sultan
|Unknown
|Hagia Sophia in Istanbul
|-
|Sultan Ahmed I
|1590-1617
|Sultan Ahmed Mosque in Istanbul
|-
|Mahfiruz Hatun
|c. 1590-c. 1610/c. 1620
|Eyüp Cemetery in Istanbul
|-
|Kösem Sultan
|c. 1589-1651
|Sultan Ahmed Mosque in Istanbul
|-
|Sultan Osman II
|1604-1622
|Sultan Ahmed Mosque in Istanbul
|-
|Sultan Murad IV
|1612-1640
|Sultan Ahmed Mosque in Istanbul
|-
|Sultan Ibrahim
|1615-1648
|Hagia Sophia in Istanbul
|-
|Turhan Sultan
|c. 1627-1683
|Tomb of Turhan Sultan in Istanbul
|-
|Saliha Dilaşub Sultan
|?-1690
|Süleymaniye Mosque in Istanbul
|-
|Muazzez Sultan
|?-1687
|Süleymaniye Mosque in Istanbul
|-
|Şivekar Sultan
|1627-c. 1647
|Hagia Sophia in Istanbul
|-
|Sultan Mehmed IV
|1642-1693
|Tomb of Turhan Sultan in Istanbul
|-
|Gülnuş Sultan
|c. 1642-1715
|Yeni Valide Mosque in Istanbul
|-
|Sultan Suleiman II
|1642-1691
|Süleymaniye Mosque in Istanbul
|-
|Sultan Ahmed II
|1643-1695
|Süleymaniye Mosque in Istanbul
|-
|Rabia Sultan
|c. 1670-1712
|Süleymaniye Mosque in Istanbul
|-
|Sultan Mustafa II
|1664-1703
|Tomb of Turhan Sultan in Istanbul
|-
|Saliha Sultan
|c. 1680-1739
|Tomb of Turhan Sultan in Istanbul
|-
|Şehsuvar Sultan
|c. 1682-1756
|Nuruosmaniye Mosque in Istanbul
|-
|Sultan Ahmed III
|1673-1736
|Tomb of Turhan Sultan in Istanbul
|-
|Mihrişah Kadın
|?-1732
|New Mosque in Istanbul
|-
|Şermi Kadın
|?-c. 1732
|New Mosque in Istanbul
|-
|Sultan Mahmud I
|1696-1754
|Tomb of Turhan Sultan in Istanbul
|-
|Sultan Osman III
|1699-1757
|Tomb of Turhan Sultan in Istanbul
|-
|Sultan Mustafa III
|1717-1774
|Laleli Mosque in Istanbul
|-
|Mihrişah Sultan
|c. 1745-1805
|Mausoleum of Mihrişah Sultan in Istanbul
|-
|Sultan Abdul Hamid I
|1725-1789
|Tomb of Abdul Hamid I in Istanbul
|-
|Şebsefa Kadın
|c. 1766-c. 1805
|Şebsefa Kadın Mosque in Istanbul
|-
|Sineperver Sultan
|1759/1760-1828
|Eyüp Sultan Mosque in Istanbul
|-
|Nakşidil Sultan
|c. 1761-1817
|Mausoleum of Nakşidil Sultan in Istanbul
|-
|Sultan Selim III
|1761-1808
|Laleli Mosque in Istanbul
|-
|Sultan Mustafa IV
|1779-1808
|Tomb of Abdul Hamid I in Istanbul
|-
|Sultan Mahmud II
|1785-1839
|Tomb of Mahmud II in Istanbul
|-
|Bezmiâlem Sultan
|c. 1807-1853
|Tomb of Mahmud II in Istanbul
|-
|Aşubcan Kadın
|c. 1795-1870
|Tomb of Mahmud II in Istanbul
|-
|Hoşyar Kadın
|?-c. 1859
|Mecca
|-
|Pertevniyal Sultan
|c. 1810-1884
|Pertevniyal Valide Sultan Mosque in Istanbul
|-
|Sultan Abdulmejid I
|1823-1861
|Yavuz Selim Mosque in Istanbul
|-
|Servetseza Kadın
|1823-1878
|Yavuz Selim Mosque in Istanbul
|-
|Tirimüjgan Kadın
|?-1852
|New Mosque in Istanbul
|-
|Düzdidil Kadın
|c. 1825-1845
|New Mosque in Istanbul
|-
|Şevkefza Kadın
|c. 1823-1889
|New Mosque in Istanbul
|-
|Zeynifelek Hanım
|c. 1824-c. 1842
|Fatih Mosque in Istanbul
|-
|Gülcemal Kadın
|c. 1826-1851
|New Mosque in Istanbul
|-
|Verdicenan Kadın
|1825-1889
|New Mosque in Istanbul
|-
|Nükhetsezâ Hanım
|1827-1850
|New Mosque in Istanbul
|-
|Mahitab Kadın
|c. 1830-c. 1888
|New Mosque in Istanbul
|-
|Nesrin Hanım
|c. 1826-1853
|New Mosque in Istanbul
|-
|Ceylanyar Hanım
|c. 1830-1855
|Fatih Mosque in Istanbul
|-
|Nergizev Hanım
|c. 1830-1848
|New Mosque in Istanbul
|-
|Navekmisal Hanım
|c. 1838-1854
|New Mosque in Istanbul
|-
|Nalandil Hanım
|c. 1829-c. 1865
|New Mosque in Istanbul
|-
|Şayeste Hanım
|c. 1836-1912
|Şehzade Ahmed Kemaleddin Mausoleum in Istanbul
|-
|Serfiraz Hanım
|c. 1837-1905
|Şehzade Ahmed Kemaleddin Mausoleum in Istanbul
|-
|Gülüstü Hanım
|c. 1831-c. 1865
|Fatih Mosque in Istanbul
|-
|Perestu Kadın
|c. 1830-1904
|Mihrişah Sultan Mausoleum in Istanbul
|-
|Sultan Abdulaziz
|1830-1876
|Tomb of Sultan Mahmud II
|-
|Dürrünev Kadın
|1835-1895
|Tomb of Sultan Mahmud II
|-
|Hayranidil Kadın
|1846-1895
|Tomb of Sultan Mahmud II
|-
|Edadil Kadın
|?-1875
|Tomb of Sultan Mahmud II
|-
|Nesrin Kadın
|?-1876
|Imperial ladies mausoleum, New Mosque, Istanbul
|-
|Gevheri Kadın
|1856-1884
|Imperial ladies mausoleum, New Mosque, Istanbul
|-
|Sultan Murad V
|1840-1904
|New Mosque, Istanbul
|-
|Mevhibe Kadın
|1844-1936
|Ortaköy Cemetery
|-
|Resan Hanım
|1860-1910
|Mehmed Ali Pasha Mausoleum, Eyüp Cemetery, Istanbul
|-
|Sultan Abdul Hamid II|1842-1918
|Tomb of Sultan Mahmud II
|-
|Nazikeda Kadın
|1848-1895
|Imperial ladies mausoleum, New Mosque, Istanbul
|-
|Bedrifelek Kadın
|1851-1930
|Yahya Efendi cemetery
|-
|Bidar Kadın
|1855-1918
|Şehzade Ahmed Kemaleddin Mausoleum, Yahya Efendi Cemetery
|-
|Dilpesend Kadın
|1861-1901
|Yahya Efendi Cemetery, Istanbul
|-
|Mezidimestan Kadın
|1869-1909
|Yahya Efendi Cemetery, Istanbul
|-
|Emsalinur Kadın
|1866-1950
|Yahya Efendi Cemetery, Istanbul
|-
|Müşfika Kadın
|1872-1961
|Yahya Efendi Cemetery, Istanbul
|-
|Sazkar Hanım
|1873-1945
|Cemetery of the Sulaymaniyya Takiyya, Damascus, Syria
|-
|Peyveste Hanım
|1873-1944
|Bobigny cemetery, Paris
|-
|Fatma Pesend Hanım
|1876-1928
|Karacaahmet Cemetery, Üsküdar, Istanbul
|-
|Behice Hanım
|1882-1969
|Yahya Efendi Cemetery, Istanbul
|-
|Saliha Naciye Hanım
|1887-1925
|Tomb of Sultan Mahmud II
|-
|Sultan Mehmed V|1844-1918
|Tomb of Sultan Mehmed V Reşad, Eyüp, Istanbul
|-
|Kamures Kadın
|1855-1921
|Tomb of Sultan Mehmed V Reşad, Eyüp, Istanbul
|-
|Mihrengiz Kadın
|?-1938
|Khedive Tewfik Pasha Mausoleum, Cairo, Egypt
|-
|Dürrüaden Kadın
|1860-1909
|Gülüstü Hanım mausoleum, Fatih Mosque, Fatih, Istanbul
|-
|Sultan Mehmed VI|1861-1926
|Cemetery of Sulaymaniyya Takiyya, Damascus, Syria
|-
|Nazikeda Kadın
|1866-1947
|Abbas Hilmi Pasha Mausoleum, Abbasiye Cemetery
|-
|Inşirah Hanım
|1887-1930
|Emir Sultan Cemetery, Istanbul
|-
|Müveddet Kadın
|1893-1951
|Çengelköy Cemetery
|-
|Nevvare Hanım
|1901-1992
|Derbent cemetery
|-
|Nevzad Hanım
|1902-1992
|Karacaahmet Cemetery
|-
|Caliph Abdulmejid II'''
|1868-1944
|Al-Baqi', Medina, Saudi Arabia
|-
|Şehsuvar Hanım
|1881-1945
|Bobigny cemetery
|-
|Mehisti Hanım
|1890-1964
|Brookwood Cemetery, London
|}

Poland
Permanent kingdom from 1320 until 1795. The kings were elected, so many dynasties from Lithuania, Sweden, France, Saxony and Poland were taking turns. Nevertheless, most of them were buried in Kraków.

Portugal
Kingdom from 1139 until 1910. The list includes all Portuguese monarchs (House of Burgundy, House of Aviz, House of Habsburg and House of Braganza).

Prussia
Kingdom from 1701–1918 (since 1871–1918 Prussian King was Emperor of German Reich (personal union). The Prussian kings/German emperors were buried in Berlin and Potsdam, the last emperor in his Dutch exile.

Romania
Kingdom from 1866 until 1947.

Russia
Tsardom from 1328 until 1721, empire from 1721 until 1917. The lists starts with the Romanov dynasty in 1613. The tsars were first buried in Moscow, later in St Peter and Paul's Cathedral in St Petersburg.

Saxony
Kingdom from 1806 until 1918 (before that from 1697 until 1763 in personal union with Poland).

ScotlandSee also Great Britain''
Kingdom since 843, since 1606 unified with England. The lists starts with the Alpin dynasty in 843. Most of the Scottish kings were buried in the island of Iona, the Dunfermline Abbey and in Holyrood Abbey.

Serbia 

The historical Serbian monarchy existed as a grand principality (1101–1217), a kingdom (1217–1346), an empire (1346–1371), and several principalities until the Ottoman conquest finalized in 1540. The modern Kingdom of Serbia existed 1882 until 1918, when it was transformed into the Kingdom of Yugoslavia, which existed until 1943.

Sicily
A County from 1072 until 1130 and a Kingdom from 1130 until 1816. After the extinction in 1409 of the cadet Sicilian branch of the House of Barcelona (heir of the Siculo-Norman Hauteville dynasty and of the Sicilian branch of the House of Hohenstaufen), the kingship was vested in another monarch (personal union) such as the King of Aragon, the King of Spain, the Austrian Emperor and then the kings of the House of Bourbon-Two Sicilies. In 1816 the island Kingdom of Sicily merged with the Kingdom of Naples to form the Kingdom of the Two Sicilies.

Spain
The list starts with the unification of the kingdoms of Castile and Aragon under the monarchs Ferdinand and Isabella. After CharlesI (V), almost every Spanish monarch was buried at El Escorial.

Sweden
The list starts with the Vasa dynasty in 1521. Since the 15th century, almost every monarch was buried in the Riddarholm Church in Stockholm. In the 20th century, the royal Haga cemetery was founded. Queen Christina is the only female monarch who was buried at St Peter's in Rome.

Westphalia
Kingdom from 1807 until 1813.

Württemberg
Kingdom from 1806 until 1918. The kings were buried in Ludwigsburg and Stuttgart.

Yugoslavia
Kingdom from 1882 until 1945. (until 1918 Kingdom of Serbia, until 1921 Kingdom of the Serbs, Croats and Slovenes, and until 1943 Kingdom of Yugoslavia). All kings from the Karadordevic dynasty are buried in the St George's chapel in Topola, Serbia.

References

External links
 Sovereigns, Kingdoms and Royal Landmarks of Europe

Burials
European monarchs